The following are the list of Indonesian diplomats that served as Ambassador of the Republic of Indonesia to the Kingdom of Saudi Arabia.
<onlyinclude>

See also 

 List of Indonesian ambassadors
 List of diplomatic missions of Indonesia
 Embassy of Saudi Arabia, Jakarta
 Foreign relations of Saudi Arabia
 Indonesia–Saudi Arabia relations

References 

Ambassadors of Indonesia
Ambassadors of Indonesia to Saudi Arabia